Satluj Valley (alternative spelling Sutlej) is a valley in the Kinnaur district of Himachal Pradesh, India. Sutlej river runs through it.

Valleys of Himachal Pradesh
Geography of Kinnaur district